The Keble Hills are an imposing line of granite hills rising to , including from west to east Murphy Peak, Handley Hill, Auger Hill and Coral Hill. The hills separate Salmon Glacier and Garwood Valley in the Denton Hills of Victoria Land, Antarctica. They were named by the New Zealand Geographic Board in 1994 after Keble Martin, a New Zealand botanist who surveyed plants of New Zealand and the sub-Antarctic.

References

Hills of Victoria Land
Scott Coast